Greys Lake is a natural lake in located just  from Sisseton, in Marshall County, South Dakota, in the United States near Long Hollow Housing, SD.

Greys Lake has the name of a local family of settlers.

See also
List of lakes in South Dakota

References

Lakes of South Dakota
Lakes of Marshall County, South Dakota